Molotov and Haze is the eighth studio album released by British musician, songwriter and producer Steven Wilson under the pseudonym Bass Communion.

The album consists of four tracks, and, according to Steven Wilson's website, is divided into two sections: "2 noisy tracks (Molotov) and 2 transcendently beautiful tracks (Haze)." All pieces were generated from guitar and recorded from 14 to 17 February 2008.

The album was issued in miniature card gatefold sleeve. Some excerpts from "Haze" and "Corrosive" can be heard on the Bass Communion Myspace page. An excerpt from "Molotov" can be heard through the Important Records website.

Vinyl edition 

In April 2009, Molotov and Haze was released in a double LP vinyl edition by Tonefloat Records with extended versions of "Molotov 1502" and "Haze 1402".
The edition was limited to 500 copies on 180 grams black vinyl in gatefold picture sleeve, and contained a 10" LP of Haze Shrapnel as a bonus disc.

Track listing

Personnel 
 Steven Wilson – guitars
 Carl Clover (for Aleph) – cover design

Release history

References 

2008 albums
Bass Communion albums
Important Records albums